Richard Merritt Montague (September 20, 1930 – March 7, 1971) was an American mathematician and philosopher who made contributions to mathematical logic and the philosophy of language. He is known for proposing Montague grammar to formalize the semantics of natural language. As a student of Alfred Tarski, he also contributed early developments to axiomatic set theory (ZFC). For the latter half of his life, he was a professor at the University of California, Los Angeles until his early death, believed to be a homicide, at age 40.

Career
At the University of California, Berkeley, Montague earned a BA in Philosophy in 1950, an MA in Mathematics in 1953, and a PhD in Philosophy in 1957, the latter under the direction of the mathematician and logician Alfred Tarski. Montague spent his entire career teaching in the UCLA Department of Philosophy, where he supervised the dissertations of Nino Cocchiarella and Hans Kamp.

Montague wrote on the foundations of logic and set theory, as would befit a student of Tarski. His PhD dissertation, titled Contributions to the Axiomatic Foundations of Set Theory, contained the first proof that all possible axiomatizations of the standard axiomatic set theory ZFC must contain infinitely many axioms. In other words, ZFC cannot be finitely axiomatized.

He pioneered a logical approach to natural language semantics that became known as Montague grammar. This approach to language has been especially influential among certain computational linguists—perhaps more so than among more traditional philosophers of language. In particular, Montague's influence lives on in grammar approaches like categorial grammar (such as Unification Categorial Grammar, Left-Associative Grammar, or Combinatory Categorial Grammar), which attempt a derivation of syntactic and semantic representation in tandem and the semantics of quantifiers, scope and discourse (Hans Kamp, a student of Montague's, co-developed Discourse Representation Theory).

Montague was an accomplished organist and a successful real estate investor. He died violently in his own home; the crime is unsolved to this day. Anita Feferman and Solomon Feferman argue that he usually went to bars "cruising" and bringing people home with him. On the day that he was murdered, he brought home several people "for some kind of soirée", but they strangled him.

In popular culture
Three novels have been inspired by the life and death of Richard M. Montague:

The Mad Man by American science fiction author Samuel R. Delany (1994)
 Less Than Meets the Eye by American philosopher David Berlinski (1994)
 The Semantics of Murder by Irish writer Aifric Campbell (2008)

See also
American philosophy
List of American philosophers
List of unsolved murders

Notes

References
 Feferman, Anita, and Solomon Feferman, 2004. Alfred Tarski: A Life. Cambridge Univ. Press.
Donald Kalish, and Montague, Richard, 1964. Logic: Techniques of Formal Reasoning. Harcourt, Brace, and Jovanovich.
 Donald Kalish, and Montague, Richard, and Mar, Gary, 1980. Logic: Techniques of Formal Reasoning (second edition). Oxford University Press.
 Montague, Richard, 1974. Formal philosophy : selected papers of Richard Montague / ed. and with an introd. by Richmond H. Thomason. New Haven: Yale Univ. Press.
 Partee, Barbara H., 2006, "Richard Montague (1930 - 1971)" in Brown, Keith, ed., Encyclopedia of Language and Linguistics, Vol. 8, 2nd ed. Oxford: Elsevier: 255–57. Includes a bibliography of the secondary literature on Montague and his eponymous grammar.

External links
 
 "Montague, Richard (1930–1971) ." Encyclopedia of Philosophy, Encyclopedia.com. 
Montague Semantics at Stanford Encyclopedia of Philosophy
RICHARD MONTAGUE 1930-1971 memorial page by Ivano Caponigro published on the fiftieth anniversary of his death
That’s Just Semantics! (or, the Proper Treatment of Richard Montague in Literary Fiction) (Archived by Wayback Machine).

1930 births
1971 deaths
1971 murders in the United States
20th-century American mathematicians
20th-century American philosophers
American logicians
LGBT academics
LGBT people from California
American LGBT scientists
Male murder victims
People from Stockton, California
Philosophers of language
Semanticists
Unsolved murders in the United States
LGBT mathematicians
Deaths by strangulation in the United States
People murdered in Los Angeles
20th-century American LGBT people